Yaël Menache (born 12 May 1985 in Peronne, France) is a French politician of the National Rally.

She has served as a Member of the National Assembly for Somme's 5th constituency since 2022.

Biography

Early life and career
Menache was born in 1985 in Peronne to a family of Iraqi-Jewish descent and grew up in Somme. Her father worked as an accountant and her mother was a civil servant. She obtained a degree in philosophy at the University of Lille and completed a course in law at the Catholic University of Lille. She then worked as a business manager for an IT company.

She is married and has two children.

Political career
Menache has stated that she joined the National Rally out of love for France and "patriotic values" but also to counter antisemitism within the party and elsewhere in French politics. In 2021, she unsuccessfully stood for the RN in Péronne during the municipal elections of that year and also unsuccessfully contested Somme during the regional elections.

In 2022, she was appointed department secretary for the RN in Somme. During the 2022 French legislative election she contested Somme's 5th constituency and was successful at gaining the seat during the second round.

References 

1985 births
Living people
National Rally (France) politicians
Deputies of the 16th National Assembly of the French Fifth Republic
Women members of the National Assembly (France)
21st-century French women politicians
French people of Jewish descent
French Jews
Jewish politicians
French people of Iraqi descent